Patu marplesi is a species of small spiders, endemic to Samoa. It is considered the smallest spider in the world, as male legspan is 0.46 mm (0.018 in).

References 

Symphytognathidae
Spiders of Oceania
Endemic fauna of Samoa
Spiders described in 1959
Taxa named by Raymond Robert Forster